Vrbovce ( or ) is a settlement in the foothills of the Žumberak/Gorjanci range in the Municipality of Šentjernej in southeastern Slovenia. It is part of the traditional region of Lower Carniola and is now included in the Southeast Slovenia Statistical Region.

References

External links
Vrbovce on Geopedia

Populated places in the Municipality of Šentjernej